Carl Hering (Philadelphia, 19 March 1860 – 10 May 1926) was an American engineer involved in studies on electric batteries and electric furnaces. He also made discoveries on electromagnetic force.

Biography 
He was one of the sons of Constantine Hering, pioneer of homeopathy in the United States. He studied mechanical engineering at the University of Pennsylvania in Philadelphia, where he earned his Bachelor's degree in 1880 and then stayed on to teach mathematics and mechanical engineering. In 1883 he began his studies in electrical engineering as Erasmus Kittler's first assistant at the Faculty of Electrical Engineering of TU Darmstadt, Germany, where the first chair of electrical engineering had been created the year before.

Upon his return to Philadelphia in 1886, he founded a consulting firm which he continued until his death, specializing in work on electric furnaces and electrolysis, electrochemical and electrophysical processes. In 1887 he obtained his Master of Science also at the University of Philadelphia. In 1889 he participated in the World Exposition in Paris on behalf of the American government and around 1890 he studied the possibility of making electric batteries, obtaining several patents on the subject.

In 1902, together with E. F. Roeber, C. J. Reed, and J. W. Richards, he founded the American Electrochemical Society of which he was president from 1906 to 1907. He was appointed officer of Public Education by the French government in 1889 and decorated a Knight of the Legion of Honor in 1891.

In 1908 Carl Hering developed an experiment on electromagnetic induction to study its fundamental laws, an experiment similar to later Blondel's experiments.

Honors and awards 

 1891: Knight of the Order of the Legion of Honor

Bibliography 

 
 
 Hartmut Grabinski: Der Heringsche Versuch: Mythen und Fakten (1908). In: Electrical engineering 1997, Band 80, Nr. 5, S. 285–290,

See also 

 Maxwell–Lodge effect
 Riccardo Felici

References 

1860 births
1926 deaths
19th-century American engineers
20th-century American engineers
American electrical engineers
Scientists from Philadelphia
University of Pennsylvania School of Engineering and Applied Science alumni
American consultants
Chevaliers of the Légion d'honneur